Leandro da Silva Alves (born 16 January 1999) is a Brazilian footballer who plays as a winger.

Club career
Silva made his professional debut with Rio Ave F.C. in a 0-0 Primeira Liga tie with Belenenses SAD on 29 February 2020.

References

External links
 

1999 births
Footballers from São Paulo (state)
Living people
Brazilian footballers
Association football wingers
Rio Ave F.C. players
Primeira Liga players
Liga Portugal 2 players
Campeonato de Portugal (league) players
Brazilian expatriate footballers
Brazilian expatriate sportspeople in Portugal
Expatriate footballers in Portugal
People from Penápolis